Terrani is a surname. Notable people with the surname include:

 Lucia Valentini Terrani (1946–1998), Italian coloratura mezzo-soprano .
 Giovanni Terrani (born 1994), Italian football player

See also
 Terragni

Italian-language surnames